Tomáš Vandas (born 3 March 1969) is a Czech far-right politician, who has been chairman of the non-parliamentary Workers' Party of Social Justice since 2003.

Education and occupation 
Vandas was born in Prague. Having completed a plumbing course, he continued his education at the High School of Industrial Technology. He is a graduate of the Jan Amos Komensky University of Prague, where he achieved a bachelor's degree in social and mass communication.

Political career 
Vandas began his political activism in 1995. From 1997-98 he worked for the Coalition for Republic - Republican Party of Czechoslovakia, initially as an assistant to an MP, and later as a member of the party's audit committee. After the parliamentary elections in 1998 he became general secretary to SPR-RSČ. In 2003 he was a founding member of the Workers' Party, and has been its chairman since 31 May 2003.

Vandas stood in the senate elections in 2010 but was unsuccessful, receiving 5.13% of the vote. In March 2012, Vandas announced his intention to run for Czech president in the 2013 direct presidential elections, but failed to collect the required 50,000 signatures.

References

External links 
 Official website (in Czech)
 Official website of Workers' party

Living people
1969 births
Czech politicians
Czech eurosceptics
Czech fascists
Candidates in the 2013 Czech presidential election
Politicians from Prague
Rally for the Republic – Republican Party of Czechoslovakia politicians
Leaders of Workers' Party of Social Justice
Workers' Party of Social Justice presidential candidates